The Record may refer to:

Music
 The Record (Fear album), a 1982 studio album by the hardcore-punk band Fear
 The Record (Boygenius album), a 2023 studio album by the indie rock supergroup Boygenius
 The Records, an English power pop band
 Their Greatest Hits: The Record, a 2001 greatest-hits album by the pop-music group Bee Gees

Periodicals
 The Record (magazine) (1981–2001), Canadian music industry magazine
 The Record (Melbourne), Australian weekly founded in 1869 
 The Record (Montgomery County, Pennsylvania) (1980s–90s), newspaper
 The Record (North Jersey), New Jersey newspaper
 The Record (Perth) (1874–present), Australian newspaper
 The Record (Sherbrooke), Quebec, Canada newspaper
 The Record (Stockton, California), California newspaper
 The Record (Troy), New York newspaper
 The Record (Waterloo Region), Ontario, Canada newspaper
 The Record, weekly newspaper in Leitchfield, Kentucky published by Landmark Community Newspapers
 The Record Music Magazine, music magazine of India
 The Columbia University Record, the University's official publication

Other uses
 The Record (film), a 2000 South Korean horror film directed by Ki-Hun Kim

See also
 Record (disambiguation)